Schwellenbach is a surname. Notable people with the surname include:
Edgar W. Schwellenbach (1887–1957), American judge from the state of Washington, brother of Lewis
Lewis B. Schwellenbach (1894–1948), American politician and judge from the state of Washington, brother of Edgar
Spencer Schwellenbach (born 2000), American baseball player